The Burt Kimball House, at 817 Park Ave. in Park City, Utah, was built in 1882.  It was listed on the National Register of Historic Places in 1984.

It was a one-story hall-parlor plan house.

References

National Register of Historic Places in Summit County, Utah
Houses completed in 1882